Khaleej Times is a daily English language newspaper published in Dubai, United Arab Emirates. Launched on 16 April 1978, Khaleej Times is the UAE's longest-running English daily newspaper.

History and profile
A partnership between the UAE government, the Galadari Brothers and the Dawn Media Group in Pakistan began publishing the daily on 16 April 1978, making it the first English daily in the UAE. The founding team consisted of Mahmoud Haroon, Muzammil Ahmed, M.J. Zahedi, Malcolm Payne (the first editor-in-chief) and Iqbal Noorie (in charge of circulation). They were soon joined by Patrick Heyland who was in charge of advertising and promotion.

The editorial staff of the paper includes multiple nationalities, mostly from the Indian subcontinent (India, Pakistan, Bangladesh and Sri Lanka), but also Emiratis, Arabs from the wider region (notably Egyptians, Syrians and Jordanians), Lebanese, Mexicans, British, Americans and Filipinos. The broadsheet comprises the general news section, City Times (lifestyle and entertainment), a business section, a sports section, the WKND magazine, and a classifieds section (Buzzon). The newspaper also consists of special reports and supplements which allow for community advertisements and other services. Its main competitors are The National, Gulf News and, formerly, 7days, which closed in December 2016.

In September 2020, Khaleej Times introduced a free news subscription service on Telegram, sending regular news updates every day to its subscribers.

Additional publications

Young Times is aimed at children and is a popular magazine among 9 to 14 year olds.

Buzzon carries local advertisements about cars, real estate, recruitment, educational services and matrimonial announcements.

WKND, a feature product, is published on Fridays. It discusses a range of topics that are of interest to men, women and children. Stories are balanced between topics and themes of local interest and international relevance.

KhaleejTimes.com is the global face of the newspaper on the internet. The online version offers additional stories and exclusives not found in the print version.

Khaleej Times also publishes special supplements, including on the national days of countries including the UAE, Pakistan and India.

References

External links 
 
 
 

1978 establishments in the United Arab Emirates
Newspapers established in 1978
Daily newspapers published in the United Arab Emirates
English-language newspapers published in the United Arab Emirates
Arab mass media
Dawn Media Group